Óskarsdóttir is an Icelandic patronymic surname, literally meaning "daughter of Óskar". It may refer to:

Steinunn Valdís Óskarsdóttir (born 1965), Icelandic politician
Valdís Óskarsdóttir (born 1950), Icelandic film editor

Icelandic-language surnames